Flemming Møller Mortensen (born 3 July 1963 in Store Brøndum) is a Danish politician of the Social Democrats who has been serving as a member of the Folketing since the 2007 elections. He is currently serving as Minister for Development and Nordic Cooperation in the government of Prime Minister Mette Frederiksen.

Political career
Mortensen sat in the municipal council of Skørping Municipality from 2001 to 2007, and then sat in the newly formed Rebild Municipality's municipal council in 2007. In 2007 he was also elected into parliament. 

On 19 November 2020 Mortensen was appointed Minister of Development and Nordic Cooperation.

Other activities
 Joint World Bank-IMF Development Committee, Member (since 2022)
 World Bank, Ex-Officio Member of the Board of Governors (since 2020)

References

External links 
 Biography on the website of the Danish Parliament (Folketinget)

|-

1963 births
Living people
People from Rebild Municipality
Danish municipal councillors
Social Democrats (Denmark) politicians
Government ministers of Denmark
Danish LGBT politicians
Members of the Folketing 2007–2011
Members of the Folketing 2011–2015
Members of the Folketing 2015–2019
Members of the Folketing 2019–2022
Members of the Folketing 2022–2026